The Nursing and Midwifery Council (NMC) is the regulator for nursing and midwifery professions in the UK. The NMC maintains a register of all nurses, midwives and specialist community public health nurses and nursing associates eligible to practise within the UK. It sets and reviews standards for their education, training, conduct and performance. The NMC also investigates allegations of impaired fitness to practise (i.e. where these standards are not met).

It has been a statutory body since 2002, with a stated aim to protect the health and well-being of the public. The NMC is also a charity registered with the Charity Commission, charity number 1091434 and in Scotland with the Office of the Scottish Charity Regulator, charity number SC038362. All Council members are trustees of the charity.

History

UKCC 
In 1983, the United Kingdom Central Council for Nursing, Midwifery and Health Visiting (UKCC) was set up following the Nurses, Midwives and Health Visitors Act 1979, replacing the General Nursing Council for England and Wales established by the Nurses Registration Act 1919, the Central Midwives Board in London and seven other bodies. The UKCC was expected to maintain a register of UK nurses, midwives and health visitors, provide guidance to registrants, and handle professional misconduct complaints. At the same time, National Boards were created for each of the UK countries. Their main functions were to monitor the quality of nursing and midwifery education courses, and to maintain the training records of students on these courses.  

In 1990 the UKCC introduced Project 2000 a higher education scheme in the United Kingdom for nursing qualifications. In 1991 the UKCC agreed proposals for Post-registration Education and Practice (PREP).  PREP took several years to introduce, with the final framework being agreed in 1994, and the scheme itself being introduced in 1995. PREP developed into the current scheme of Revalidation which was implemented in April 2016.

Establishment of NMC 
This structure of the UKCC survived with minor modifications up to April 2002, when the UKCC ceased to exist and its functions were taken over by a new Nursing and Midwifery Council (NMC). This was legislated for in the Parliament of the United Kingdom, through the Nursing and Midwifery Order 2001. The English National Board was also abolished and its quality assurance function was taken on board by the NMC. The other National Boards were also abolished, but new bodies were created in each country to take over their functions.

Council 
The NMC Council has two key roles: setting the strategic direction for the NMC and overseeing the work of senior NMC staff.

The Council ensures that the NMC complies with all relevant legislation, including the Nursing and Midwifery Order 2001 and the Charities Act 1993.

The Council is made up of 12 lay and registrant members, including one member from each of the four UK countries. They are appointed by the Privy Council. Registrant members are from a nursing or midwifery background; lay members are selected for their expertise in various fields and strategic experience.

The current Council took office on 1 May 2013.

Role 
The NMC's role is to:

 protect the health and wellbeing of the public
 set standards of education, training, conduct and performance so that nurses and midwives can deliver high quality healthcare consistently throughout their careers
 ensure that nurses and midwives keep their skills and knowledge up to date and uphold the NMC’s professional standards, and
 have clear and transparent processes to investigate nurses and midwives who fall short of the NMC’s standards.

Activities 

The NMC has an annual income in excess of £52 million and employs over 400 staff. To fulfill the activities of the NMC it charges a registration fee to its members.

Education 

The NMC set standards, guidance and requirements for nursing and midwifery education across the UK. These standards help to shape the content and design of programmes and state what a registered nurse or midwife needs to know and be able to do.

The NMC approves higher education institutions to deliver programmes. They currently accredit 1000 programmes in 79 education institutions across the UK.

When students successfully complete their programme, their education institution will let the NMC know that they have met the education and practice standards and are of good health and good character. If they are deemed fit to practise they will then be eligible to apply to join the register. Each year the NMC receives over 22,000 newly qualified nurses and midwives from education institutions.

Registering nurses and midwives 

 there are 690,773 nurses and midwives on the NMC register, meaning the NMC is the body responsible for regulating the largest number of healthcare professionals in the UK. Nurses and midwives must be on the NMC register to practise in the UK. Anyone is able to search the NMC register.

Registering nursing associates 

As of June 2019, there are 1,000 nursing associates on the NMC register.

Setting standards 

The NMC's revised code became effective on 31 March 2015. The code contains professional standards of practice and behaviour that all nurses and midwives must keep to.
Four key sections describe what nurses and midwives are expected to do:
• prioritise people
• practise effectively
• preserve safety, and
• promote professionalism and trust.

The Code was updated to reflect changes in healthcare and society since its last publication in 2008. The updates include new requirements on the fundamentals of care, the duty of candour, raising concerns and social media use.

The introduction to the code states: “When joining our register, and then renewing their registration, nurses and midwives commit to upholding these standards. This commitment to professional standards is fundamental to being part of a profession. We can take action if registered nurses or midwives fail to uphold the Code. In serious cases, this can include removing them from the register. The Code should be useful for everyone who cares about good nursing and midwifery.”

Revalidation 

The NMC has committed to developing and implementing a system of revalidation. In October 2015, the NMC introduced the new system which all nurses and midwives in the UK must go through to remain on the NMC register. Nurses and midwives will need to renew their registration every three years and confirm that they continue to remain fit to practise by meeting the principles of the revised Code. They must demonstrate that they have completed the required hours of practice and learning activity through continuing professional development, have used feedback to review and improve the way they work, and have received confirmation from someone well placed to comment on their continuing fitness to practise.

The NMC ran a public consultation from January to March 2014 on how revalidation can be applied in practice. Pilots involving over 2,000 nurses and midwives across the UK would inform the final plans. Revalidation for nurses and midwives will start on 1 April 2016, with approximately 16,000 nurses and midwives going through the process initially. All nurses on the NMC register will eventually go through revalidation when their registration is up for renewal. In January 2016, the NMC launched a microsite to assist nurses and midwives through the revalidation process.

Managing complaints about nurses and midwives 

The NMC handles complaints made about nurses and midwives, and investigates allegations where appropriate. The NMC has the power to restrict a nurse or midwife's practice or strike them off their register.

The NMC produced guidance for nurses and midwives on raising concerns which aims to help them take action in the public interest when needed. It includes information on legislation that offers protection to whistleblowers and information on organisations nurses and midwives can go to for further advice.

Helene Donnelly, ambassador for cultural change at Staffordshire and Stoke-on-Trent Partnership NHS Trust, spoke to NMC Council about raising concerns and gave her support to the guidance.

Legislation

Changes to healthcare regulation 
On 2 April 2014, the Law Commission published its draft bill, Regulation of Health and Social Care Professionals. The bill aims "to aim to sweep away the out-dated and inflexible decision-making processes associated with the current legislation." The bill would give healthcare regulators in the UK more autonomy.

The NMC's Chief Executive and Registrar Jackie Smith welcomed the publication of the draft bill, but stated how the NMC needs the bill to become law quickly if it is able to modernise and become an efficient regulator. In its current legislative framework, the NMC spends nearly 80% of its income of fitness to practise hearings.

Affecting regulation of professionals within the EU 

The revised Mutual Recognition of Professional Qualifications (MRPQ) Directive, which came into effect 19 January 2016, will bring in a number of changes that aim to further facilitate the free movement of professionals within the EU, including amendments to language controls. The changes will enable the NMC to ensure, on a case-by-case basis, that a nurse or midwife from the EU has sufficient knowledge and command of English to practise safely and effectively.

Criticism

Accusations of bullying and racism 

On 11 March 2008 two Members of Parliament Jim Devine and John Smith made accusations in the House of Commons of bullying and racism within the NMC. The accusations have been denied by the NMC. The government set up an independent inquiry asking the Council for Healthcare Regulatory Excellence and the Charity Commission to investigate.

The NMC have been accused of nepotism by its members, Nursing Standard, letters-2017. Due to senior members of the NMC also being the instigating officer in cases against nurses, belonging to the same NHS Trust. In one instance a nurse was struck off for a data issue; whereas another nurse witnessed assaulting patients was only suspended for one year. (BFNHST, 2017).

Panorama controversy 

On 16 April 2009, nurse Margaret Haywood was barred from practising as a Nurse in the UK following a ruling by the NMC Conduct and Competence committee panel. This followed Haywood's contribution to a BBC Panorama television programme, exposing significant deficiencies in care at the Royal Sussex County Hospital, an acute teaching hospital in Brighton, England. The public and media response was generally antagonistic towards the NMC, the response being described by the Royal College of Nursing as 'unduly harsh'. On 12 October 2009, the striking off order was dropped, and replaced with a one-year caution.

Regulatory criticism 

In an early July 2012 report, the Council for Healthcare Regulatory Excellence (CHRE), now known as the Professional Standards Authority for Health and Social Care (PSA), critically examined the leadership of the Nursing and Midwifery Council. In late July 2012, a new chair for the NMC, Mark Addison, was appointed by the privy council, an appointment which was subject to criticism by the NMC Council, who described their "grave concern" with regard to what they claimed was a "lack of an open, transparent and equal opportunities process" in regards to the appointment. In contrast, the CHRE stated that they were pleased with the appointment of a new Chair, and that they would "look forward to working with Mark Addison". On 26 June 2015, the PSA reported in their performance review 2014–2015 report that the NMC had made overall improvements in their performance.

Data loss 

In March 2013 the NMC was fined £150,000 by the Information Commissioner's Office after it admitted that personal data, including "highly sensitive" information about nurses and about vulnerable children, had been placed on DVD without being encrypted, sent by courier and then lost. The ICO said that "it should have been obvious ... that such a contravention would be of a kind likely to cause substantial distress to the data subjects due to the nature of the data involved".

Increase in membership cost 
The cost charged to remain registered on the NMC has increased from £76 per year in 2013, to £100 in 2014. Since 2015 the registration fee is £120. The annual registration fee to the NMC is an allowable expense for UK income tax, however a survey by the NMC discovered that more than 75 percent of NMC registrants do not claim tax relief on their registration.

Morecambe Bay
The council was criticised by Bill Kirkup for the way it handled the investigation resulting from events at University Hospitals of Morecambe Bay NHS Foundation Trust relating to misconduct by two midwives involved in the Furness General Hospital scandal.  He said their response to his report had "fallen far short of expectations". The Professional Standards Authority said the regulator's investigation was "deficient" because evidence was not presented to the panel by the council, even though it had it in its possession.  In 2018 the authority reported that the council had ignored more than 20 concerns raised by Cumbria police in 2012 for two years and that its handling of complaints was “frequently incompetent”. There was poor behaviour by staff towards families, reluctance to take concerns seriously and a lack of openness about mistakes it had made.  The chief executive, Jackie Smith, resigned.

English language test
The process of registering nurses from abroad includes an English language test which has been criticised as too difficult.  According to Sir Andrew Foster, “There are thousands of nurses, who came to the UK in the early 2000s and after, who had qualified as nurses in India but can’t get registration here because they have not passed the language test.”  Peter Mount, former chair of Manchester University NHS Foundation Trust said the language requirements were to ensure patient safety, although when questioned but NMC have no evidence of fitness to practise cases being brought against overseas nurses related to language weakness. "I am aware of nurses who have taken these language tests over 10 times and have been living and working in care and health settings in [the] UK for over 10 years.--  The test is said to be discriminatory because it demands an academic standard of reading and writing that many native English speakers could not meet.  This means at least 3,000 qualified nurses ​from India ​who are already in the UK are not on the register, and so are paid less for similar work. British applicants generally are only required to have Grade C GCSE.   In September 2022, after a consultation exercise, the Council agreed to changes which were intended to slightly relax the testing procedures.

Regulator 
The Professional Standards Authority for Health and Social Care (PSA), is an independent body accountable to the UK Parliament, which promotes the health and wellbeing of the public and oversees the nine UK healthcare regulators, including the Nursing and Midwifery Council.

In 2015 it was suggested that the costs of regulating the Nursing and Midwifery Council would be paid for by the membership of the NMC i.e. nurses and midwives.

In 2015 the PSA published the 2014 audit it had undertaken of the NMC which found that whilst it had improved, it was still failing in areas.

See also
Nursing in the United Kingdom
Royal College of Nursing
Maternity in the United Kingdom

References

External links
Nursing and Midwifery Council
NMC YouTube channel

Maternity in the United Kingdom
Government agencies established in 2002
Health in the City of Westminster
Medical and health regulators
Medical associations based in the United Kingdom
Medical regulation in the United Kingdom
Midwifery in the United Kingdom
Midwifery organizations
Nursing education in the United Kingdom
Nursing organisations in the United Kingdom
Nursing licensing organizations
Organisations based in the City of Westminster
2002 establishments in the United Kingdom
Regulators of the United Kingdom